Hławiczka is a Polish surname. Notable people with the surname include:

 Andrzej Hławiczka (1866-1914), musicologist and educator
 Karol Hławiczka (1894-1976), composer, pianist and educator, son of Andrzej

See also 
 Hlawiczka (Czech surname)
 Hlaváček (Czech surname)
 Hlawka
 Hlavečník

Polish-language surnames